Elliot C. Graham is an American film editor and producer known for his work on Milk (2008), Steve Jobs (2015), Captain Marvel (2019), and No Time to Die (2021).

He was nominated for an Academy Award for Best Film Editing for Milk and won a BAFTA Award for Best Editing for No Time to Die.

Career
In 1999, Graham received a bachelor's degree in History and Film from New York University. His first editing credit was for The Last Minute (2001), an independent film that was written, directed, and edited by Stephen Norrington. Graham was initially hired to assist Norrington with editing, but ultimately shared the editing credit. Graham subsequently worked on two films with director Bryan Singer, X2 (2003) and Superman Returns (2006), both co-edited with John Ottman. Graham also edited the Singer-directed pilot for the television program House (2004).

Elliot Graham's editing for Gus Van Sant's 2008 film Milk was nominated for the Academy Award for Best Film Editing and for the American Cinema Editors Eddie Award. Several critics have written about the editing of Milk, which intermixes archival footage from the era of the film with footage of the actors.

Filmography (as editor)
The director of each film is indicated in parenthesis.
 The Last Minute (Stephen Norrington, 2001; co-editor with Stephen Norrington)
 X2 (Bryan Singer, 2003; co-editor with John Ottman)
 The Greatest Game Ever Played (Bill Paxton, 2005)
 Superman Returns (Bryan Singer, 2006; co-editor with John Ottman)
 21 (Robert Luketic, 2008)
 Milk (Gus Van Sant, 2008)
 Restless (Gus Van Sant, 2011)
 Trash (Stephen Daldry, 2014)
 Steve Jobs (Danny Boyle, 2015)
 Molly's Game (Aaron Sorkin, 2017)
 Captain Marvel (Anna Boden and Ryan Fleck, 2019; co-editor with Debbie Berman)
 No Time to Die (Cary Joji Fukunaga, 2021; co-editor with Tom Cross)

References

External links
 
 

American film editors
Tisch School of the Arts alumni
Living people
1976 births